Tommy Magnus Kihlstedt (born 29 February 1972) is a Swedish former professional footballer who played as a goalkeeper. He played professionally in Sweden, Norway, and Denmark, and won two Danish Superliga titles with FC Copenhagen. He won 13 caps for the Sweden national team between 1998 and 2004, and was a squad player at UEFA Euro 2000, the 2002 FIFA World Cup, and UEFA Euro 2004.

Career statistics

Club 

1 All games in the UEFA Cup.
2 3 games in the UEFA Champions League qualifying rounds, 6 games in the UEFA Cup.
3 1 game in the UEFA Champions League qualifying round, 2 games in the Scandinavian Royal League.

International

Honours
Oddevold
 Division 1 Södra: 1995

FC København

 Royal League: 2004–05
 Superligaen: 2002–03, 2003–04
 DBU Pokalen: 2003–04
 Danish Super Cup: 2004

References

1972 births
Living people
Swedish footballers
F.C. Copenhagen players
UEFA Euro 2000 players
2002 FIFA World Cup players
UEFA Euro 2004 players
Sweden international footballers
SK Brann players
Lillestrøm SK players
Danish Superliga players
Allsvenskan players
Eliteserien players
Swedish expatriate footballers
Expatriate footballers in Norway
Swedish expatriate sportspeople in Norway
Expatriate men's footballers in Denmark
IK Oddevold players
Swedish expatriate sportspeople in Denmark
Association football goalkeepers